The Individual is the journal of the Society for Individual Freedom published in London, the United Kingdom. It was started in October 1976 as a newsletter under the title Newsletter of the Society for Individual Freedom. The magazine is published two or three times per year. Since 2002 Nigel Gervas Meek has served as the editor of the magazine. Paul Anderton is the former editor.

References

External links
 The Individual

Biannual magazines published in the United Kingdom
Magazines established in 1976
Political magazines published in the United Kingdom
Triannual magazines published in the United Kingdom
Downloadable magazines
Magazines published in London